Edward Butler was a state legislator who served in the Louisiana Senate.

Biography 

Butler was born 1842/3 in Massachusetts.

He was elected to represent Plaquemines Parish, Louisiana in the Louisiana Senate from 1870 until 1874.
He also was a recorder for the parish and served as a member of the school board.

In 1871 Governor Henry C. Warmoth appointed Butler and P. B. S. Pinchback as members of a commission to find a site for a new State House.

Butler was charged with fraud in relation to his service on the school board in 1878 but was never prosecuted.

While a senator he was beaten and stabbed by a crew member of the Bannock Rock riverboat after trying to gain access to a first class cabin.

See also
 African-American officeholders during and following the Reconstruction era

References

1840s births
African-American politicians during the Reconstruction Era
Louisiana state senators